Gruening Glacier is a broad glacier descending southeast between steep rock walls to the northwest part of Hilton Inlet, on the east coast of Palmer Land, Antarctica. It was discovered by the United States Antarctic Service (USAS) in a flight down this glacier from East Base on December 30, 1940, and was named for Ernest H. Gruening, Director of the Division of Territories and Island Possessions, U.S. Department of the Interior, during the inception of the USAS, and a member of the Executive Committee by which the USAS was directed; later U.S. Senator from Alaska.

References

Glaciers of Palmer Land